Jorge Fernández (born 25 September 1968) is a Uruguayan equestrian. He competed in the individual eventing at the 2000 Summer Olympics.

References

External links
 

1968 births
Living people
Uruguayan male equestrians
Olympic equestrians of Uruguay
Equestrians at the 2000 Summer Olympics
Pan American Games medalists in equestrian
Pan American Games bronze medalists for Uruguay
Equestrians at the 1999 Pan American Games
Place of birth missing (living people)
Medalists at the 1999 Pan American Games
20th-century Uruguayan people
21st-century Uruguayan people